The Sarah Pennington House is a private house located at 719 Maple Street in Petoskey, Michigan. It was placed on the National Register of Historic Places in 1986.

The Sarah Pennington House is a -story frame Queen Anne structure with a front roof gable. The gable end on the front facade has an elliptical arch seen in Colonial Revival and  Shingle Style designs. Below the gable is a single story polygonal bay window with a hipped roof. The entrance is located on the side of building, through a projecting entrance bay. The house has one-over-one wood-framed window units capped with cornices.

The Sarah Pennington House was constructed some time before 1902. When built, the house was a twin of the structure next door, which implies it may have been erected by a builder as a speculative investment. By 1917 it was owned by Sarah Pennington. Pennington was widowed and used the house to take on boarders.

References

Houses on the National Register of Historic Places in Michigan
Queen Anne architecture in Michigan
Shingle Style architecture in Michigan
Colonial Revival architecture in Michigan
National Register of Historic Places in Emmet County, Michigan